= Farmers' Review =

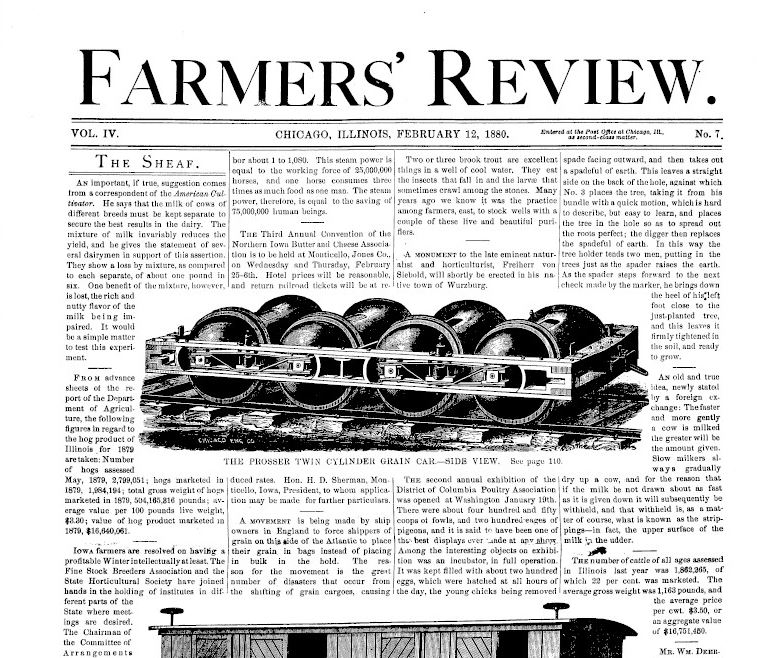
- Farmers' Review 1880
- Type: Weekly newspaper
- Owner(s): Hannibal H. Chandler; National Stockman and Farmer Company
- Founded: 1877
- Headquarters: Chicago, Illinois

Farmers' Review was a weekly newspaper published in Chicago, Illinois starting in 1877. It was founded by A. Moore. In 1883 it was purchased and managed by Hannibal H. Chandler and edited by Oscar C. Gibbs. In 1909 it was bought by National Stockman and Farmer Company. The main focus of the newspaper was agriculture and livestock production.
